"Pretty Girl" is a song by American singer and songwriter Maggie Lindemann. It is her first major-label single, and was released on September 30, 2016, through 300 Entertainment. The song was written by Lindemann, Sasha Sloan, and Sean Myer, with the production being handled by Jayson DeZuzio.

Background
Lindemann said in an interview with Billboards Braudie Blais-Billie:

Critical reception
Jeff Nelson of People said "in the defiant pop track, Lindemann, 18, blasts haters and affirms that she's more than her appearance" and called it an "infectious single". Idolator's Mike Wass stated that "Pretty Girl" is "something of a departure from her independent fare. The dark and gloomy sound of the 18-year-old's early material has given way to a more defiant and optimistic approach" and later claimed "I preferred the diva's dark-pop phase, but the song has an important message". Hugh McIntyre of Forbes called it "a catchy pop number" but later remarked that the song is "off to a fair start on streaming sites, but will she be able to break through and become a mainstream hitmaker? It wouldn't be out of the question for a social star to top the charts, so don't laugh off the possibility".

Music video
A music video for the song, directed by Roman White, was released on March 9, 2017.

Background
In an interview with People, Lindemann said:

Track listing

Charts

Weekly charts

Year-end charts

Certifications

Release history

References

2016 singles
2016 songs
Maggie Lindemann songs
Body image in popular culture
Songs with feminist themes
Songs written by Maggie Lindemann
Songs written by Sasha Alex Sloan